Hyderabad Football Club is an Indian professional football club based in Hyderabad, Telangana. The club competes in the Indian Super League, the top flight of Indian football. Founded on 27 August 2019, the club replaced  Pune City after they were disbanded and their franchise rights were sold to Telangana businessman Vijay Madduri and former Kerala Blasters CEO Varun Tripuraneni. Later, actor Rana Daggubati stepped in as one of the co-owners. The club began their first professional season in October 2019.

On 16 June 2020, German club Borussia Dortmund struck a partnership deal with the club for grassroots development. Manuel Márquez Roca is the current Hyderabad head coach, taking over on 31 August 2020 replacing Albert Roca who went to FC Barcelona as a fitness coach. Hyderabad play their home matches at the G.M.C Balayogi Athletic Stadium in the Hyderabad suburb of Gachibowli. The stadium has a capacity of 30,000 for matches.

Hyderabad played their inaugural match on 25 October 2019, suffering a 0–5 defeat to ATK. The club completed their first season in the Indian Super League in 10th place, failing to qualify for the playoffs. The club won their first ever championship in the 2021–22 ISL by defeating Kerala Blasters 3–1 penalties in the final.

History

Formation
In February 2019, it was reported that Indian Super League side Pune City were struggling financially and that their owners were looking to sell the franchise. The club reportedly were behind on paying players and had also attempted to discuss merging with local rivals Mumbai City. After the 2018–19 season, Pune City released all their players and participated in the Super Cup using academy players.

On 26 August 2019, it was reported by the Hindustan Times that Pune City had disbanded and that former Kerala Blasters CEO Varun Tripuraneni had bought a majority stake in the club. Neither then Pune City CEO Gaurav Modwel or Tripuraneni confirmed the reports. However, the next day, on 27 August 2019, it was announced that Hyderabad would replace Pune City for the 2019–20 season, with Tripuraneni and businessman Vijay Madduri buying the ownership rights to the franchise. The club's branding and first kits were then revealed prior to their first season on 29 September 2019.

Inaugural season
On 29 August 2019, it was announced that Phil Brown, the last head coach of Pune City, would be the first head coach for Hyderabad. In late September, just before the start of the 2019–20 season, it was revealed that Hyderabad had signed almost every player from Pune City's final squad.

The club played their first ever match on 25 October 2019 against ATK at the Salt Lake Stadium. They were defeated 0–5 in a match which Brown described as "not our usual standards". Hyderabad then succumbed to defeat again in their second match against Jamshedpur. Marcelinho scored the first goal for the club's history but could not prevent his side's 1–3 defeat. The club finally earned their first victory in their third match on 2 November 2019 against the Kerala Blasters. This was also Hyderabad's first home match. Goals from Marko Stanković and Marcelinho helped Hyderabad to a 2–1 victory.

On 11 January 2020, with the club in last place in the table, with just one victory and two draws from 12 matches, Brown and the club decided to part ways. Former India international Mehrajuddin Wadoo took over as caretaker for one match before assistant coach Xavier Gurri López became interim coach for the rest of the season. The club finished their season with a 5–1 victory over NorthEast United on 20 February 2020. Overall, the club finished the season in last place and failed to qualify for the ISL playoffs.

2020–21 season
Ahead of the 2020–21 Indian Super League season, Hyderabad appointed Manolo Márquez as their head coach after Albert Roca mutually parted ways with the club when he was approached by FC Barcelona to become their fitness coach.

Hyderabad FC began their second competitive season on 23 November with a win against Odisha FC. After struggling early in the season, the team made a decent comeback, as they had an unbeaten run which lasted for 12 matches. They managed to get 29 points from 20 games, which includes six wins, three losses and eleven draws. Their last game against FC Goa became crucial for them as they needed a win to qualify into the playoffs. After having a goaless draw against Goa, Hyderabad narrowly missed the play-offs as they finished 5th in the league table.

2021–22 season 
In their third season of the Indian Super League, Hyderabad FC won their maiden title on March 20, 2022 in Margao, Goa. They beat Kerala Blasters 3-1 on penalties after the match finished 1-1 after extra time.  

Hyderabad FC goalkeeper Laxmikant Kattimani saved four penalties in the shootout, including one that was retaken after being saved initially.

2022-23 season 
In their fourth season of the Indian Super League, Hyderabad FC finished 2nd in the table to directly qualify for the Semi-Final and avoiding Knockout match.

Crest, colours & kits

The team colours and logo for Hyderabad were unveiled on 21 September 2019. The club colours are yellow and black. According to the club, the logo is titled "Reliving Hyderabad's Football Legacy" and is meant to represent Hyderabad and the city's heritage. The logo features the minarets from the Charminar in the city and Koh-i-Noor diamonds. According to Hyderabad co-owner Vijay Madduri, the logo "is inspired from the city's history, we now hope that HFC will be a great boost for the sport in the region... we can give a boost to the legacy that is already present in the city's history and roots."

Kit manufacturers and shirt sponsors

Stadium

Hyderabad play their home matches at the G.M.C Balayogi Athletic Stadium, located in the Hyderabad suburb of Gachibowli. A multi-purpose stadium, the stadium is mainly used to host football matches and was built in 2002 prior to the 2003 Afro-Asian Games. The stadium used to host matches for Fateh Hyderabad in the I-League 2nd Division but the club relocated after saying that the "pitch was not in good shape". Prior to Hyderabad's first season, the grass was relaid and the stadium was renovated and cleaned in anticipation of the 2019–20 season.

Supporters
In a very short period of time Hyderabad FC have managed to get local support from the city fans. In their first home match against Kerala Blasters, more than 14,000 people came to support the club which the club won by 2-1. Deccan Legion is active fan group of Hyderabad FC.

Ownership
The current co-owners of Hyderabad are Staicu Adrian, Varun Tripuraneni, and Rana Daggubati. Madduri, the chief executive officer of the Hyderabad-based company Incessant Technologies, said that he was looking forward to his "significant role in developing football in the state, reviving its past glory". Tripuraneni is the former CEO of the Kerala Blasters, another Indian Super League side. During the club's announcement, Tripuraneni said "It is a proud moment for me, to be co-owner of Hyderabad FC. Hyderabad is a city with great football culture. I look forward to working with key stakeholders and building a strong foundation for the club, which will eventually contribute to society and do the city proud. Our immediate task is to prepare for the new season".

On 24 October 2019, it was announced that prominent Telugu actor Rana Daggubati would also join Madduri and Tripuraneni as a co-owner of the club. After acquiring ownership, Daggubati stated "Hyderabad has a great legacy with the sport. This team, therefore, is a chance to rekindle that legacy."

Players

First-team squad

Out on loan

Former players

Reserves

Personnel

Current technical staff

Records and statistics

Head coaches record

Team records

Most appearances

Most goals

eSports
The organizers of ISL introduced eISL, a FIFA video game tournament, for the ISL playing clubs, each represented by two players. Hyderabad FC hosted a series of qualifying games for all the participants wanting to represent the club in eISL. On 20 November the club announced the signing of the two players.

Roster

Honours 
 Indian Super League
 Champions (1): 2021–22
 Premiership
 Runners-up: 2021–22, 2022–23

Affiliated clubs

The following clubs are currently affiliated with Hyderabad FC:

  Borussia Dortmund (2020–present)
  Marbella FC (2020–present)

References

External links

 Hyderabad at the Indian Super League official website
 Hyderabad at the AIFF official website

 
Indian Super League teams
Football clubs in Hyderabad
Association football clubs established in 2019
2019 establishments in Telangana
Sport in Hyderabad, India